Bela antwerpiensis is an extinct species of sea snail, a marine gastropod mollusk in the family Mangeliidae.

Description
The length of the shell attains 6 mm, its diameter 2.7 mm.

Distribution
This extinct marine species was found in Pliocene strata in  Belgium

References

External links
  Image of Bela antwerpiensis

antwerpiensis